Romanta T. Miller House, also known as the Fraser Farm, is a historic home located at Wheatland, Monroe County, New York. It was built in 1869–1870, and is a two-story, Italianate style brick and masonry dwelling. The house has a -story rear kitchen addition. It sits on a cut limestone foundation and has an overhanging slate roof. It features a Colonial Revival full height entrance and sleeping porch designed by architect Claude Fayette Bragdon and added in 1914.  Also on the property are the contributing large "U"-shaped barn (c. 1870, 1940) and a small garden shed / machine shop.

It was listed on the National Register of Historic Places in 2014.

References

Houses on the National Register of Historic Places in New York (state)
Italianate architecture in New York (state)
Colonial Revival architecture in New York (state)
Houses completed in 1870
Buildings and structures in Monroe County, New York
National Register of Historic Places in Monroe County, New York